Maksim Chizh (born 8 October 1993) is a Belarusian professional footballer who plays for Volna Pinsk.

Honours
Dinamo Brest
Belarusian Cup winner: 2016–17

References

External links 
 
 

1993 births
Living people
Belarusian footballers
Association football midfielders
Belarusian expatriate footballers
Expatriate footballers in Lithuania
FC Dinamo Minsk players
FC Bereza-2010 players
FC Dynamo Brest players
FK Atlantas players
FC Dnepr Mogilev players
FC Rukh Brest players
FC Volna Pinsk players